"Keep on Dancin'" is a 1979 single by Gary's Gang, a disco group, from Queens, New York. Their debut release of "Keep on Dancin'" was their most successful.

The single peaked at number 15 on the soul singles chart, number 41 on the US Billboard Hot 100, and number 33 on the Cash Box Top 100.  In the UK, the song reached number eight, and number 31 in Canada.  In 1990, the song recharted in the UK for one week (#98).

Along with their tracks, "Do It at the Disco" and "Let's Lovedance Tonight", "Keep on Dancin'" hit number one on the disco chart for one week. In 1999, the track, "Let's Lovedance Tonight" was sampled for Soulsearcher, number twenty dance hit, "Can't Get Enough". "Do It At The Disco" was the B side of the 45 RPM of "Keep On Dancin'."

In film
 Keep on Dancin' was in the 1998 film and soundtrack of 54.
 Keep on Dancin' was in the 2018 Netflix documentary Studio54.

Chart performance

Weekly singles charts

References

External links
 

1979 debut singles
Disco songs
1978 songs
Columbia Records singles
Songs about dancing